This is a list of metaphysicians, philosophers who specialize in metaphysics. See also Lists of philosophers.

Metaphysicians born BC
 Pythagoras
 Thales
 Anaximander
 Anaximenes
 Xenophanes
 Heraclitus
 Parmenides
 Zeno of Elea
 Melissus of Samos
 Leucippus
 Democritus
 Anaxagoras
 Empedocles
 Alcmaeon of Croton
 Hippasus
 Diogenes of Apollonia
 Plato
 Eudoxus of Cnidus
 Speusippus
 Xenocrates
 Aristotle

Metaphysicians born between 1 and 600 AD
 Numenius
 Alexander of Aphrodisias
 Ammonius Saccas
 Origen of Alexandria
 Origen the Pagan
 Plotinus
 Porphyry
 Iamblichus
 Syrianus
 Proclus
 Ammonius Hermiae
 Pseudo-Dionysius the Areopagite
 Olympiodorus the Younger
 Damascius
 Simplicius of Cilicia
 John Philoponus

Metaphysicians born between 600 and 1400
 John Scotus Eriugena
 Al-Farabi
 Avicenna
 Anselm of Canterbury
 Peter Abelard
 Al-Ghazali
 Maimonides
 Averroes
 Ibn Arabi
 Fakhr al-Din al-Razi
 Albertus Magnus
 Bonaventure
 Thomas Aquinas
 Giles of Rome
 Duns Scotus
 William of Ockham
 Jean Buridan
 Jean Capréolus
 Meister Eckhart

Metaphysicians born between 1400 and 1700
 Thomas Cajetan
 Francisco Suárez
 Domingo Báñez
 Robert Bellarmine
 John of St. Thomas
 René Descartes
 Anne Conway
 Baruch Spinoza
 Nicolas Malebranche
 Gottfried Leibniz
 George Berkeley
 Christian Wolff
 Jakob Böhme

Metaphysicians born between 1700 and 1800
 Immanuel Kant
 Georg W. F. Hegel
 Arthur Schopenhauer
 Friedrich W. J. Schelling
 Johann G. Fichte
 Friedrich H. Jacobi

Metaphysicians born between 1800 and 1900

Metaphysicians born after 1900

Metaphysicians